Italian Fever is 1999 novel by Valerie Martin.

Plot summary
Part romance and part mystery, it tells the story of New Yorker Lucy Stark, who travels to Tuscany to wind up the affairs of her late boss – a writer named DV, who has died after falling down a well while staying at a remote villa.  Lucy's job begins as a grim task, but a series of events and revelations during her stay in Italy start to provide her with an insight into DV, and ultimately help her to gain a greater understanding of herself.

1999 American novels
American romance novels
Novels by Valerie Martin
Alfred A. Knopf books
Novels set in Tuscany
Novels about writers